Jomhuri Avenue is a street in the centre of Tehran, Iran.  It has shops for the purchase of electronic equipment. Jomhuri is officially known as Jomhuri Islami Avenue which means Islamic republic. It is home to Tehran's biggest mobile phone shopping centre, Alaeddin (known as Bazaar-e Alaeddin). It is also a place where Tehran youngsters hang out during the evening.

Before the 1979 Revolution, the avenue's name was Shah (King).

See also

References

Streets in Tehran